Pinswang is a municipality in the Austrian Ausserfern region of the northern Tyrol. It lies on the border with the Allgäu region of Bavaria in Germany.

References

Cities and towns in Reutte District